Corey Lamonte Chavous (born January 5, 1976) is a former American football defensive back who played 11 seasons in the National Football League (NFL). Chavous played for three teams, at both safety and cornerback. Chavous was known as one of the most instinctive defensive backs of his era and was a Pro Bowl selection in 2003. He is the founder of the media company and website DraftNastyMagazine.com, which specializes in coverage of the major sports with an emphasis on scouting and professional drafts. He is currently a color analyst for college football games as well as an NFL Draft analyst for CBS Sports.

High school career
Chavous attended Silver Bluff High School in Aiken, South Carolina. In football, he was an All-Area, and an All-District pick, and in track, he was an All-State choice and was part of a 4 × 100 relay team which won the state title. He was a high school teammate of former Chicago Bears and Vikings wide receiver D'Wayne Bates.

College career
Chavous attended Vanderbilt University. He finished his career with 12 interceptions (which ranks sixth on the school's all-time list), made 199 tackles, and batted down 31 passes. He graduated with a degree in human and organizational development.

Professional career

Arizona Cardinals
Chavous was selected by the Arizona Cardinals in the second round (33rd overall) in the 1998 NFL Draft. In his rookie season he played in 16 games, starting five, recording 28 tackles and two interceptions, his first coming at the Kansas City Chiefs on November 30.  During the team's 1999 NFC Wildcard playoff 20-7 victory over the Dallas Cowboys, Chavous notched five tackles and six passes defensed.  In 1999, he played in 15 games recording 40 tackles and one interception. The following year, he made 48 tackles and one interception. In his final year with the Cardinals, Chavous made 74 tackles and one interception.

Minnesota Vikings
On March 25, 2002, Chavous signed a four-year contract with the Minnesota Vikings as an unrestricted free agent. In his debut season he started in all 16 games recording 83 tackles, three interceptions and one touchdown, the first of his career at the Detroit Lions on December 29. In 2003, he made 86 tackles, a career-high eight interceptions and one touchdown. His performances that season earned him a trip to the 2004 Pro Bowl. The following year, he made 81 tackles and one interception. In his final season with the Vikings, Chavous started all 16 games for a fourth straight season, recording 71 tackles and two interceptions.

St. Louis Rams
On March 13, 2006, Chavous signed a three-year contract with the St. Louis Rams as an unrestricted free agent. During the subsequent 2006 NFL Draft, he was an analyst alongside Mike Mayock and Rich Eisen for their draft coverage. In his first season, he equaled his career-high of 86 tackles and made one interception. In 2008, he started 14 games making 75 tackles and 3.5 sacks.

On February 13, 2009, Chavous was released by the Rams.

NFL statistics

Post-playing career
Chavous has been featured on various sports programs as an analyst of college football talent, especially in regards to their potential for the National Football League draft and is currently a color analyst and draft analyst for CBS Sports. Chavous was one of the lead analysts on the NFL Network's first-ever coverage of the draft at Radio City Music Hall in 2005. Along with host Rich Eisen and NFL Network draft guru Mike Mayock, the trio covered all of the NFL Network's two-day weekend.

Chavous' website, DraftNastymagazine.com, covers the NFL Draft on a year-round basis. Chavous and his scouts tour college campuses to find NFL Draft prospects and related issues to spotlight.

Personal life
Chavous is the nephew of former Denver Broncos defensive end Barney Chavous. He is also the cousin of Fred Vinson, former NFL and Vanderbilt University football player.

References

External links
St. Louis Rams bio – dead link
DraftNastymagazine.com – Founder

1976 births
Living people
Sportspeople from Aiken, South Carolina
American football safeties
American football cornerbacks
Vanderbilt Commodores football players
National Conference Pro Bowl players
Arizona Cardinals players
Minnesota Vikings players
St. Louis Rams players
Players of American football from South Carolina
College football announcers
Ed Block Courage Award recipients